Lakhiwal  or Lakhiwal Sharif is a village and union council 139 of Sahiwal Tehsil, Sargodha District, Pakistan. It lies on the Jhelum River.

It is known for its greenery and Khajoor, common in this area.

Demographics 
Its population amounts to about 3800 (2017).

Sufism 
Lakhiwal Sharif is a Sufi spiritual centre. It contains the shrine of the Sufi saint Syed Muhammad Afzal Shah and Syed Ahmad Anwar Shah Hamdani and of their descendants.

Former saints are ancestors of Saadat-E-Hamdania living in Lakhiwal sharif.
Sajada Nasheen Darbar Lakhiwal Sharif is Syed Ali Shah Sultan Bilawal Hamdani (Syed Muhammad Afzal Shah Hamdani).

The custodian of Sakhi Shah Chuttan Imam Hamdani, Syed Mehdi Shah Hamdani and great sufi saint Alhaj Syed Ahmed Anwer Shah Hamdani's holy shrines is Syed Muhammad Siraj Ul Haq Hamdani Qadri.

History 
Lakhiwal Sharif's history can be traced to the 18th century when Syeds migrated from Danda Shah bilawal district Chakwal and settled here.

References

Populated places in Sargodha District